Bill Latham may refer to:

 Bill Latham (baseball) (born 1960), former Major League Baseball pitcher
 Bill Latham (basketball), wheelchair basketball player from Australia
 Bill Latham (footballer) (born 1907), Australian footballer

See also
William Latham (disambiguation)